Yafi, also known as Zorop, is an Eastern Pauwasi language of West New Guinea. It is spoken in Warlef village, Senggi District, Keerom Regency.

Basic vocabulary
Below are some basic vocabulary words in Zorop.

{| 
|+ Zorop basic vocabulary
! gloss !! Zorop
|-
| ‘I’ || nam
|-
| ‘you (sg)’ || nem
|-
| ‘we’ || nim
|-
| ‘belly’ || yalək
|-
| ‘bird’ || awe
|-
| ‘black’ || seŋgəri
|-
| ‘blood’ || mob
|-
| ‘breast’ || muam
|-
| ‘come’ || kwalopai
|-
| ‘eat’ || fer-
|-
| ‘eye’ || ji
|-
| ‘foot’ || fuŋi
|-
| ‘give’ || tipi
|-
| ‘good’ || kiap
|-
| ‘hand’ || jae
|-
| ‘head’ || məndai
|-
| ‘hear’ || fau
|-
| ‘house’ || nab
|-
| ‘louse’ || yemar
|-
| ‘man’ || arab
|-
| ‘mosquito’ || yəŋkar
|-
| ‘name’ || jei
|-
| ‘road’ || mai
|-
| ‘root’ || fiŋgu
|-
| ‘sand’ || gərək
|-
| ‘tooth’ || jurai
|-
| ‘tree’ || war
|-
| ‘water’ || jewek
|-
| ‘who’ || waunap
|-
| ‘one’ || aŋgətəwam
|-
| ‘two’ || anəŋgar
|}

References

East Pauwasi languages
Languages of western New Guinea